The Tunisian Ice Hockey Association (ATHG) is the governing body of ice hockey in Tunisia.

History
The Tunisian Ice Hockey Association was founded in 2009, and was later accepted into the International Ice Hockey Federation (IIHF) on 22 September 2021. Tunisia was the fourth African nation to join the IIHF after South Africa, Morocco and Algeria. The ATHG has been an associate member of the IIHF and therefore has no right to vote in the General Assembly. The current president of the ATHG is Ihab Ayed.

See also
Tunisia national ice hockey team

References

External links
IIHF profile
Hockey Tunisie at Facebook
Site officiel de l'Association Tunisienne de Hockey sur Glace 
Creation of the Tunisian Ice Hockey Association 

Ice hockey governing bodies in Africa
International Ice Hockey Federation members
Ice